The Mahaut River is a river on the Caribbean island of Dominica. The Mahaut River rises on the western slopes of Morne Trois Pitons and flows west to its mouth near Massacre.

See also
List of rivers of Dominica

References

 Map of Dominica
  GEOnet Names Server
 Water Resources Assessment of Dominica, Antigua and Barbuda, and St. Kitts and Nevis

Rivers of Dominica